White gum is a common name of a great many Eucalyptus species, all of which have smooth white bark.

Species that have "White gum" as a common name include:

 Corymbia aparrerinja (also known as ghost gum, desert white gum and Dallachy's Gum)
 Eucalyptus alba (also known as Timor white gum)
 Eucalyptus argophloia (also known as Chinchilla white gum, Queensland western white gum, Queensland white gum, and western white gum)
 Eucalyptus benthamii (Camden white gum, Dorrigo white gum)
 Eucalyptus bigalerita (Adelaide River white gum)
 Eucalyptus brevifolia (northern white gum, snappy white gum)
 Eucalyptus cupularis (Halls Creek white gum)
 Eucalyptus dalrympleana (also known as mountain white gum)
 Eucalyptus delegatensis (mountain white gum)
 Eucalyptus dorrigoensis (Dorrigo white gum)
 Eucalyptus dunnii (also known as Dunns white gum)
 Eucalyptus elata (river white gum)
 Eucalyptus haemastoma
 Eucalyptus houseana (Kimberley white gum, tropical white gum)
 Eucalyptus lanepoolei (salmon white gum)
 Eucalyptus leucophloia (snappy white gum)
 Eucalyptus lindleyana (river white gum)
 Eucalyptus micrantha
 Eucalyptus mooreana (mountain white gum)
 Eucalyptus ovata
 Eucalyptus papuana (also known as drooping white gum, Molloy white gum)
 Eucalyptus platyphylla
 Eucalyptus racemosa
 Eucalyptus rossii
 Eucalyptus rubida
 Eucalyptus scoparia (Wallangarra white gum)
 Eucalyptus signata (also known as peppermint-leaved white gum)
 Eucalyptus viminalis
 Eucalyptus wandoo (also known as wandoo)

Eucalyptus